This article is a list of political parties in Georgia, a U.S. state.

Active parties

Major parties

Third parties

Historical parties

References

Politics of Georgia (U.S. state)
Political parties in the United States by state